Aigars Kudis (born 30 December 1959) is a Latvian former swimmer. He competed in the men's 200 metre breaststroke at the 1976 Summer Olympics for the Soviet Union.

References

External links
 

1959 births
Living people
Latvian male breaststroke swimmers
Olympic swimmers of the Soviet Union
Swimmers at the 1976 Summer Olympics
Sportspeople from Riga
Universiade medalists in swimming
Universiade bronze medalists for the Soviet Union
Medalists at the 1977 Summer Universiade
Soviet male breaststroke swimmers